Laurelhurst is a neighborhood of vintage homes and undulating streets surrounding a park of the same name, straddling the NE and SE sections of Portland. Stone markers flank the entrances to the area. The center of the neighborhood, Coe Circle, contains a gilded equestrian statue of Joan of Arc, which is a World War I war memorial. The Laurelhurst Historic District was officially listed on the National Register of Historic Places in 2019.

History 

In 1909, the Ladd Estate Company sold its  Hazelfern Farm to the Laurelhurst Company for approximately $2 million. The name Laurelhurst was borrowed from a residential development in Seattle that Laurelhurst Company general manager Paul Murphy had recently completed. The name combined a reference to the laurel shrubbery near the Seattle development with the Old English hurst, denoting a wooded hill. As the first houses were being built, the city purchased  for $92,000 to construct Laurelhurst Park. Advertised as a "High Class Residence Park," the Laurelhurst Company placed numerous restrictions on the neighborhood. Similar to the Ladd's Addition development, the sale of alcohol was prohibited. Additionally, there were to be no apartments, hotels, motels, flats, stables, or commercial buildings, and no homes were to be sold to Chinese, Japanese, or African Americans.

The Laurelhurst Neighborhood Association (LNA) met as massive changes to Portland's transportation options were discussed in the 1970s, which led to the creation of Trimet MAX Light Rail in the 1980s. LNA and the community endorsed light rail being placed in the Banfield corridor, but was strongly opposed to alignment along the Burnside corridor, either a busway or light rail. A 1978 petition submitted by 34 neighbors objected "to any parking, widening, or lane changes on East Burnside Street in the Laurelhurst area now or in the future", calling it "a serious threat" to the neighborhood, that would lower property values, and be "a definite threat to our daily living pattern and destroy our neighborhood." The Portland-wide study noted a requirement to minimize projects "specifically in the Laurelhurst area". KXL-FM reported proximity to Laurelhurst Park was a selling point for realtors in this neighborhood until the homeless camp situation.

Redlining and racial covenant 
In 1913 a racial covenant governing development of Laurelhurst mandated "...nor shall the same or any part thereof be in any manner used or occupied by Chinese, Japanese or negroes, except that persons of said races may be employed as servants by residents."

A 1934 redlining map of Portland assigned the areas within current Laurelhurst boundaries with a blue grade, or "Still Desirable." Regarding the B19 tract, mapmakers noted "homogenous surroundings, improvements, and population" as among the neighborhood's favorable influences and called the subdivision's origins "a well conceived promotion, honestly administered"; regarding inhabitants, no foreign-born or Black inhabitants were reported.

Neighborhood quality of life
The official neighborhood representative Laurelhurst Neighborhood Association sought to prevent homeless camps within  of schools, parks and where children congregate and further proposing that those who camp in this area be fined up to $100 or sent to jail for up to 30 days. Its members also vocally opposed development in the neighborhood to increase housing availability.

See also

 National Register of Historic Places listings in Northeast Portland, Oregon
 National Register of Historic Places listings in Southeast Portland, Oregon

References

External links

 Portland Parks & Recreation: Laurelhurst Park
Laurelhurst Street Tree Inventory Report

 
National Register of Historic Places in Portland, Oregon
Neighborhoods in Portland, Oregon
Northeast Portland, Oregon
Southeast Portland, Oregon